The 2020 FC Cincinnati season was the club's second season in MLS, and the fifth season of a team playing under the FC Cincinnati brand after three years in the lower-division USL Championship. The club finished with a league worst 6–22–6 record in their inaugural MLS season in 2019, setting a league record for the most goals given up with 75. The 2020 season was the final year that FC Cincinnati played home matches at Nippert Stadium, as their new West End Stadium is scheduled to open in March 2021.

FC Cincinnati's offseason transfers and preseason training were executed under head coach Ron Jans. However, Jans resigned on February 17, amidst an investigation into his alleged use of a racial slur. Assistant coach Yoann Damet took over as interim head coach two weeks before FC Cincinnati's first regular season match. On May 21, 2020, Jaap Stam was named head coach. Stam becomes the fourth head coach in club's MLS history. Said Bakkati, who had worked on Stam's staff in the past, was also named new assistant coach.

Club

Roster

2020 MLS SuperDraft picks

Player movement

In

Out

Loans in

Loans out

Competitions

Preseason

Major League Soccer

League tables

Eastern Conference

MLS is Back – Group E

Overall

Results

MLS is Back Tournament

U.S. Open Cup 

Due to their final position in the 2019 MLS standings, FC Cincinnati would enter the competition in the Third Round, which was scheduled for April 19–21. However, the tournament was suspended and eventually cancelled on August 17, 2020, due to the COVID-19 pandemic.

Statistics

Appearances and goals 
Numbers after plus-sign(+) denote appearances as a substitute.

|-
! colspan=16 style=background:#dcdcdc; text-align:center|Goalkeepers

|-
! colspan=16 style=background:#dcdcdc; text-align:center|Defenders

|-
! colspan=16 style=background:#dcdcdc; text-align:center|Midfielders

|-
! colspan=16 style=background:#dcdcdc; text-align:center|Forwards

|-
! colspan=16 style=background:#dcdcdc; text-align:center|Players who have played for FC Cincinnati this season but have left the club:

|-

Top scorers 
{| class="wikitable" style="font-size: 100%; text-align: center;"
|-
! style="background:#003087; color:#FFFFFF; border:2px solid #FE5000; width:35px;" scope="col"|Rank
! style="background:#003087; color:#FFFFFF; border:2px solid #FE5000; width:35px;" scope="col"|Position
! style="background:#003087; color:#FFFFFF; border:2px solid #FE5000; width:35px;" scope="col"|No.
! style="background:#003087; color:#FFFFFF; border:2px solid #FE5000; width:140px;" scope="col"|Name
! style="background:#003087; color:#FFFFFF; border:2px solid #FE5000; width:75px;" scope="col"|
! style="background:#003087; color:#FFFFFF; border:2px solid #FE5000; width:75px;" scope="col"|
! style="background:#003087; color:#FFFFFF; border:2px solid #FE5000; width:75px;" scope="col"|Total
|-
|1
|FW
|7
|align="left"| Yuya Kubo
|3||0||3
|-
|rowspan="2"|2
|FW
|10
|align="left"| Jürgen Locadia
|2||0||2
|-
|FW
|19
|align="left"| Brandon Vazquez
|2||0||2
|-
|rowspan="5"|3
|MF
|6
|align="left"| Haris Medunjanin
|1||0||1
|-
|MF
|15
|align="left"| Allan Cruz
|1||0||1
|-
| DF
|14
|align="left"| Nick Hagglund
|1||0||1
|-
|MF
| 24
|align="left"| Frankie Amaya
|1||0||1
|-
|MF
|36
|align="left"| Joe Gyau
|1||0||1
|-
!colspan="4"|Total
!12!!0!!12

Top assists 
{| class="wikitable" style="font-size: 100%; text-align: center;"
|-
! style="background:#003087; color:#FFFFFF; border:2px solid #FE5000; width:35px;" scope="col"|Rank
! style="background:#003087; color:#FFFFFF; border:2px solid #FE5000; width:35px;" scope="col"|Position
! style="background:#003087; color:#FFFFFF; border:2px solid #FE5000; width:35px;" scope="col"|No.
! style="background:#003087; color:#FFFFFF; border:2px solid #FE5000; width:160px;" scope="col"|Name
! style="background:#003087; color:#FFFFFF; border:2px solid #FE5000; width:75px;" scope="col"|
! style="background:#003087; color:#FFFFFF; border:2px solid #FE5000; width:75px;" scope="col"|
! style="background:#003087; color:#FFFFFF; border:2px solid #FE5000; width:75px;" scope="col"|Total
|-
|rowspan="2"|1
|FW
|9
|align="left"| Adrien Regattin
|2||0||2
|-
|FW
|19
|align="left"| Brandon Vazquez
|2||0||2
|-
|rowspan="2"|2
|DF
|4
|align="left"| Greg Garza
|1||0||1
|-
|MF
|6
|align="left"| Haris Medunjanin
|1||0||1
|-
!colspan="4"|Total
!6!!0!!6

Disciplinary record 
{| class="wikitable" style="font-size: 100%; text-align:center;"
|-
| rowspan="2" !width=15|
| rowspan="2" !width=15|
| rowspan="2" !width=120|Player
| colspan="3"|MLS
| colspan="3"|Playoffs
| colspan="3"|Total
|-
!width=34; background:#fe9;|
!width=34; background:#fe9;|
!width=34; background:#ff8888;|
!width=34; background:#fe9;|
!width=34; background:#fe9;|
!width=34; background:#ff8888;|
!width=34; background:#fe9;|
!width=34; background:#fe9;|
!width=34; background:#ff8888;|
|-
|| 24 ||MF ||align=left| Frankie Amaya || 7 || 0 || 0 || 0 || 0 || 0 || 7 || 0 || 0
|-
|| 17 ||DF ||align=left| Mathieu Deplagne || 6 || 0 || 0 || 0 || 0 || 0 || 6 || 0 || 0
|-
|| 2 ||DF ||align=left| Kendall Waston || 5 || 0 || 0 || 0 || 0 || 0 || 5 || 0 || 0
|-
|| 36 ||MF ||align=left| Joe Gyau|| 4 || 0 || 0 || 0 || 0 || 0 || 4 || 0 || 0
|-
|| 96 ||DF ||align=left| Andrew Gutman || 4 || 0 || 0 || 0 || 0 || 0 || 4 || 0 || 0
|-
|| 33 ||MF ||align=left| Caleb Stanko || 3 || 0 || 0 || 0 || 0 || 0 || 3 || 0 || 0
|-
|| 6 ||MF ||align=left| Haris Medunjanin || 2 || 0 || 0 || 0 || 0 || 0 || 2 || 0 || 0
|-
|| 8 ||MF ||align=left| Allan Cruz || 2 || 0 || 0 || 0 || 0 || 0 || 2 || 0 || 0
|-
|| 14 ||DF ||align=left| Nick Hagglund || 2 || 0 || 0 || 0 || 0 || 0 || 2 || 0 || 0
|-
|| 22 ||MF ||align=left| Fatai Alashe || 2 || 0 || 0 || 0 || 0 || 0 || 2 || 0 || 0
|-
|| 23 ||DF ||align=left| Maikel van der Werff || 2 || 0 || 0 || 0 || 0 || 0 || 2 || 0 || 0
|-
|| 3 ||DF ||align=left| Tom Pettersson || 1 || 0 || 0 || 0 || 0 || 0 || 1 || 0 || 0
|-
|| 4 ||DF ||align=left| Greg Garza || 1 || 0 || 0 || 0 || 0 || 0 || 1 || 0 || 0
|-
|| 7 ||MF/FW ||align=left| Yuya Kubo || 1 || 0 || 0 || 0 || 0 || 0 || 1 || 0 || 0
|-
|| 16 ||DF ||align=left| Zico Bailey || 1 || 0 || 0 || 0 || 0 || 0 || 1 || 0 || 0
|-
!colspan=3|Total !!43!!0!!0!!0!!0!!0!!43!!0!!0

Clean sheets
{| class="wikitable sortable" style="text-align: center;"
|-
! style="background:#003087; color:#FFFFFF; border:2px solid #FE5000; width:35px;" scope="col"|No.
! style="background:#003087; color:#FFFFFF; border:2px solid #FE5000; width:160px;" scope="col"|Name
! style="background:#003087; color:#FFFFFF; border:2px solid #FE5000; width:50px;" scope="col"|
! style="background:#003087; color:#FFFFFF; border:2px solid #FE5000; width:50px;" scope="col"|
! style="background:#003087; color:#FFFFFF; border:2px solid #FE5000; width:50px;" scope="col"|Total
! style="background:#003087; color:#FFFFFF; border:2px solid #FE5000; width:50px;" scope="col"|Games
|-
| 22
| align=left| Przemysław Tytoń
|5||0||5||13
|-
| 18
| align=left| Spencer Richey
|2||0||2||10
|-
| 1
| align=left| Bobby Edwards
|0||0||0||2
|-

Awards

MLS is Back Man of the Match
The Man of the Match is named after each match by the editorial team of MLSsoccer.com.

MLS is Back Team of the Week 
The Team of the Week includes the top players and coach during each week of the tournament, as chosen by the editorial team of MLSsoccer.com.

MLS is Back Coach of the Week 
The Coach of the Week during each week of the tournament, as chosen by the editorial team of MLSsoccer.com.

MLS is Back Goal of the Week 
The Goal of the Week determines the best goal during each week of the tournament. The editorial team of MLSsoccer.com shortlists goals for fans to vote for on Twitter.

MLS Team of the Week

References 

2020 Major League Soccer season
Cincinnati
FC Cincinnati
2019